If I Marry Again is a 1925 American silent drama film directed by John Francis Dillon and written by Kenneth B. Clarke. The film stars Doris Kenyon, Lloyd Hughes, Frank Mayo, Hobart Bosworth, Anna Q. Nilsson, and Myrtle Stedman, and was released on February 15, 1925, by First National Pictures. It was based on a story by the British writer Gilbert Frankau.

Plot
As described in a review in a film magazine, stern, wealthy, and jealous of his family name, John Jordan (Bosworth) instructs his confidential manager Jeffrey Wingate (Mayo) to proceed at once to plantations in the tropics. Jordon's idea is to get his son Charles (Hughes) away from an affair with Jocelyn Margot (Kenyon), a young woman from Madame Margot's (Stedman), a place with a shady reputation. Charlie marries Jocelyn, however, and Jordan is furious. During a four-year stay, Jocelyn proves to be true blue, and a son is born. Unrelenting, Jordan sends Wingate to bring his son back, but Charles dies of fever. Jocelyn, determined to obtain advantages for her son, returns, but Jordan will have nothing to do with her despite the fact that she has won Wingate over. Accused of being a blackmailer, Jocelyn determines to reopen her mother's place under the name Jordan, but breaks down and cannot go through with it. Wingate had neglected his wife Alicia (Nilsson) for business to the extent that she fainted and died in a fall, after a stormy interview declares that if he marries again it will be with a woman whom he makes part of his life, sharing his joys and sorrows. He finally convinces Jordan that Jocelyn is true and takes her and the boy into his home.

Cast

Preservation
With no prints of If I Marry Again located in any film archives, it is a lost film.

References

External links

Still at silenthollywood.com
Stills at silentfilmstillarchive.com

1925 films
1925 drama films
American black-and-white films
Silent American drama films
American silent feature films
1920s English-language films
First National Pictures films
Films directed by John Francis Dillon
Lost American films
1925 lost films
Lost drama films
1920s American films